P. C. Sreeram ISC (born 26 January 1956) is an Indian cinematographer and film director who works in Indian films. He is also the president of Qube Cinemas, a digital cinema technology company. He is an alumnus of the Madras Film Institute. Apart from his work as a cinematographer, Sreeram was much appreciated for his directorial venture Kuruthipunal. The film was internationally acclaimed and was submitted by India as its official entry to the Oscars in 1996. Sreeram is known for his association with Bharathan, Mani Ratnam, R Balki, Vikram Kumar, and received critical acclaim for his work in films such as Thevar magan, Mouna Ragam, Nayakan, Cheeni Kum, Agni Natchathiram, Paa, Geethanjali, Alaipayuthey, I, Padman, O Kadhal Kanmani, Thiruda thiruda, Ishq, and Remo. He has worked as a cinematographer in over 30 films spanning across Tamil, Telugu, Malayalam, Kannada and Hindi language, besides directing three films and a few TV commercials in Chennai and Mumbai. He is also one of the founding members of Indian Society of Cinematographers (ISC).

Early life and family
Sreeram was born on 26 January 1956 in Madras (now Chennai). Sreeram's aspiration towards films grew much during his childhood days. He was educated at the Vidya Mandir Senior Secondary School, Mylapore, Chennai. As a student he was not interested in studies. He had a passion for photography and after many years of struggle he joined the Madras Film Institute to pursue a course in cinematography. The "Samco" group, which included Kamal Haasan, C. Rudhraiya, Santhana Bharathi, Radharavi, R. C. Sakthi, Mani Ratnam, and a few others, used to meet at a hotel in Chennai and share their knowledge of cinema and future ambitions of making a perfect film.

His niece Preetha Jayaraman, a cinematographer in the Tamil Film industry, was inspired to her calling largely by her uncle's work in the field.

Career
Sreeram received his diploma in motion picture photography from the Madras Film Institute in 1979, and made his cinematic debut in the early 1980s. One of his earlier works, Meendum Oru Kaathal Kathai (1985), won the Indira Gandhi Award for Best Debut Film of a Director in 1984. Following a few commercially unsuccessful releases, he worked with Mani Ratnam for the first time in Mouna Ragam (1986). The film gave a much-needed breakthrough for both of them. Following the film's success, the pair went on to work in Nayagan (1987). The film went on to win three National Film Awards at the 35th National Film Awards; Sreeram was awarded that year's National Film Award. He used new techniques in the camera for their next film Agni Natchathiram and was praised very much for his work. Sreeram shot all of Ratnam's films until Geethanjali (1989). The film was both critically acclaimed and commercially successful besides winning the National Film Award for Best Popular Film Providing Wholesome Entertainment and seven Nandi Awardsincluding the Best Story and Best Cinematography awards for Ratnam and Sreeram, respectively.

During the early 1990s, Sreeram worked in Gopura Vasalile (1991) and Thevar Magan (1992). He made his directorial debut in 1992 with Meera, starring Vikram and Aishwarya . The film had a delayed release and was a poor grosser at the box-office. The following year, he renewed his association with Ratnam in the latter's Thiruda Thiruda.

Sreeram directed his second film Kuruthipunal (1995), a police story based on the Hindi film Drohkaal (1994). The film was India's official entry to the Oscars in 1996. It was showcased at the Rotterdam International Film Festival under the category "Director in Focus" eight years after its release. In 2004, he directed Vaanam Vasappadum, the first Indian film to make use of high-definition digital technology. The film was screened at the Mumbai International Film Festival and the ninth International Film Festival of Kerala. In 2007, Sreeram made his Bollywood debut with R. Balki's Cheeni Kum. Since then, Sreeram has shot all of Balki's filmsPaa (2009), Shamitabh (2015), Ki & Ka (2016) and Pad Man (2018).

Legacy
Sreeram is well known for his longtime association with Mani Ratnam, Moulee and Kamal Haasan. He received critical acclaim for his work in films such as Mouna Ragam, Nayakan, Geetaanjali, Thevar Magan, Thiruda Thiruda and Alaipayuthey. He has mentored some of the prominent cinematographers in the Indian film industry including Jeeva, M. S. Prabhu, Ramji, Chezhiyan, Fowzia Fathima, Mahesh Muthuswami, Dwaraganath, Arun Vincent, Preetha Jayaraman, K. V. Anand, Tirru, Balasubramaniem, K. V. Guhan, Nirav Shah, sivakumar vijayan, tanveer mir, vivek anand, sathyan sooryan, and Arvind Krishna. In January 2016, Sreeram was elected as the president of South Indian Film Cinematographers Association.

Filmography

As cinematographer

As director

Awards

|-
! scope="row" | 1987
| Nayakan
| National Film Award for Best Cinematography
| 
| 
|-
! scope="row" | 1990
| Geethanjali
| Nandi Award for Best Cinematographer
| 
| 
|-
! scope="row" | 1992
| Thevar Magan
| Cinema Express Award for Best Cameraman
| 
|
|-
! scope="row" | 1993
| Thiruda Thiruda
| Cinema Express Award for Best Cameraman
| 
|
|-
! scope="row" | 1999
| Kadhalar Dhinam
| Dinakaran Award for Best Cinematographer
| 
|
|-
! scope="row" | 2000
| Alaipayuthey
| Filmfare Award for Best Cinematographer - South
| 
|
|-
! scope="row" | 2006
| Varalaru
| Vijay Award for Best Cinematographer (Special Jury)
| 
| 
|-
! scope="row" | 2012
| Ishq
| CineMAA Award for Best Cinematographer
| 
| 
|-
! scope="row" | 2012
| Ishq
| CineMAA Award for Life Time Contribution
| 
| 
|-
! scope"row" | 2012
| Ishq
| SIIMA Award for Best Cinematographer (Telugu)
| 
|

References

External links

 Official Website
 

Living people
Tamil film directors
Tamil-language film directors
Tamil film cinematographers
Malayalam film cinematographers
Best Cinematography National Film Award winners
M.G.R. Government Film and Television Training Institute alumni
Indian Tamil people
1956 births
Film directors from Chennai
Telugu film cinematographers
Nandi Award winners
20th-century Indian film directors
21st-century Indian film directors
20th-century Indian photographers
21st-century Indian photographers
Cinematographers from Tamil Nadu